This list of tallest buildings in Evansville ranks skyscrapers and high-rises in the U.S. city of Evansville, Indiana, by height. The city's tallest building is Fifth Third Center, which rises 226 feet (69 m) and was completed in 1981. It is the tallest building between the cities of Indianapolis, Nashville, St. Louis, and Louisville. The previous tallest building in the city was the 18-story 248-feet (76 m) 420 Main Building which was completed in 1970. It was demolished via implosion on November 21, 2021 to make way for mixed-use redevelopment.

Tallest buildings
This list ranks completed Evansville buildings that stand at least 125 feet (38 m) tall, based on standard height measurement. This height includes spires and architectural details but does not include antenna masts. An equal sign (=) following a rank indicates the same height between two or more buildings. The "Year" column indicates the year of completion.

Timeline of tallest buildings

(Under development, coming soon)

Notes

(Under development, coming soon)

References

(Under development, coming soon)

External links

(Under development, coming soon)

Buildings and structures in Evansville, Indiana
Tallest in Evansville